Petrina Alexandra Holdsworth (born 1 October 1952), is an English barrister turned politician, formerly National Chairman of the UK Independence Party (UKIP).

Career
After training as a barrister, in the late 1970s she worked in the Inner London Magistrates' Court as a Deputy Clerk to the Justices.  She went on to serve as a Principal Crown Prosecutor with the CPS, and then returned to private practice in London specialising in Crime and Industrial Tribunal work. She later trained in private detective work.

Political career
Holdsworth joined the UKIP in the 1990s, and represented the party as a candidate in two General Elections, standing against Nicholas Soames in Mid-Sussex in 2001, where she was the local UKIP constituency chairman; and Michael Howard QC (then leader of the Conservative Party) in Folkestone in 2005.

She was elected to the UKIP NEC in 2004 and became Chairman of the NEC and National Chairman in that year, during which she wrote "Bye, Bye English Legal System", which appeared on the UKIP website.

In October 2005, Holdsworth resigned from the party Chairmanship and NEC; she agreed to return a day later after undertakings were given by the then leader Roger Knapman in relation to the behaviour of one of UKIP's MEPs.  However, following further internal difficulties she resigned again on the 15th, just days ahead of the party conference.

In May 2006, Holdsworth announced her intention to run for leader of UKIP, but later withdrew her candidacy due to her husband's ill health.

In the 2009 European Parliament Elections she ran as lead candidate in South East England for the newly formed United Kingdom First Party, whose leader was Robin Page. UK First put candidates forward in three regions; after none of its candidates was elected, it was wound up in 2010.

Holdsworth was elected Chairman of The Campaign for an Independent Britain in mid-2014.

Personal life
She was married to David Voelcker, who died on 22 October 2014, and has a son and two step-daughters.

References 

Living people
UK Independence Party parliamentary candidates
1952 births